Tamarana is a small municipality in the state of Paraná, Brazil. This small town's main activities are camp cultive, domestic animal creations and tourism. The actual mayor is Roberto Dias Siena, son of the politician Edison Siena, who was the first mayor of the municipality, in 1996. The second mayor was Paulo Mitio Nakaoka, succeeded by Roberto Siena later. The nature in Tamarana is notable, many rivers and tourism places are there, like Estância Tamarana and many others. There is too an Indian Reserve of Apucaraninha, where native people live. Tamarana is next to Londrina, Ortigueira and other cities.

References

Municipalities in Paraná